The Clarinet Trio in A minor, Op. 114, is one of four chamber works composed by Johannes Brahms featuring the clarinet as a primary instrument. It was written in the summer of 1891 in Bad Ischl for the clarinettist Richard Mühlfeld and first performed privately on 24 November 1891 in Meiningen and publicly in Berlin on 12 December that year. It is considered by scholars as part of a rebirth for the composer who in 1890 declared his String Quintet in G major to be his final work.

General 
The work calls for clarinet, piano, and cello, and is one of the very few in that genre to have entered the standard repertoire.

It was written for clarinet in A, which can also be substituted by a viola.

The overall mood of the piece is sombre but includes both romantic and introspective qualities. Music historians and scholars have admitted that the trio is "not among the most interesting of his compositions" The work incorporates a considerable amount of arpeggio patterns in its theme, complemented by conversation-like passages in the upper register of the cello. Perhaps due to this lack of interesting material, Op. 114 has been overshadowed by another one of Brahms' chamber works written for Mühlfeld: the Clarinet Quintet in B minor, Op. 115.

However, it is very clear in the music that Brahms absolutely adored the playing of Richard Mühlfeld, and that this adoration made its way into the trio. Eusebius Mandyczewski, a scholar and friend of Brahms, wrote of the trio that "It is as though the instruments were in love with each other."

History 
On his fifty-eighth birthday, Brahms was busy writing his will to his publisher, initially providing for his siblings and stepmother, and secondly for his landlady, Celestine "Mandy" Truxa. Shortly afterwards, when visiting the ducal court in Meiningen in March 1891, he was deeply fascinated by the beautiful playing of the clarinettist, Richard Mühlfeld. The serious mood of his later compositions was made appropriate by the tone of the instrument. To emphasize how much he loved his performance, Brahms called Mühlfeld his Fräulein Klarinette, or "his dear nightingale". Following his performance, Brahms wrote the score of the Clarinet Trio and sent it to his landlady. In addition, the painter, Adolph Menzel was in the audience during the performance on 12 December 1891 in Berlin, with Robert Hausmann on cello and Brahms on piano. Menzel was so moved that he made a sketch of Mühlfeld as some sort of Greek god, saying to Brahms, "We often think of you here, and often enough, comparing notes, we confess our suspicions that on a certain night the Muse itself appeared in person for the purpose of executing a certain woodwind part. On this page I have tried to capture the sublime vision."

Analysis

First movement 
Allegro (sonata form, A minor, ends in A major)
The first movement is in loose sonata form, diverging from the traditional sonata layout. Brahms writes this movement with the A clarinet's range in mind, and he manages to span the entire range of the instrument, reaching as low as a C, a note that is not achievable on the standard B clarinet. Along with this extended range, Brahms also uses long, extended melodies using interplay between the cello and clarinet to support the clarinet's large, sonorous range. Later in the movement, Brahms uses fragmented rhythms, with many arpeggios, and pedal points. In doing so, Brahms reveals his inexperience at writing for the clarinet in a chamber setting, but he also strives to achieve continuous and clear writing for this unique set of instruments. One particularly unusual aspect of the movement is that the exposition section, which has modulated to E minor, ends with a plagal half-cadence (I–IV).

Second movement 
Adagio (modified sonata form without development, D major)
The second movement is written with the clarinet playing in the clarion register and chalumeau with minimal leaps in the exposition, but later Brahms turns to his favoured leaps and arpeggiation in order to transition to a new theme. Many consider this a weak method of composition; however, it has also been noted that Brahms does this to accentuate the capabilities of the clarinet. Similar to the first movement, the cello and clarinet have intermingled parts, with the piano mimicking this interplay throughout. Many criticize this style of composition because it lacks the certain depth that has been achieved with other trio groupings; however, supporters of Brahms praise this method of writing because the clarinet and cello voices interact so well, giving the piece a certain texture that is not achieved by any other type of chamber ensemble. Brahms uses interesting harmonic and rhythmic modulations in the latter half of this movement, and, combined with the already-askew format of the movement, creates a unique work and places a certain dignity on this trio that was a stark and refreshing interest for this time period.

Third movement 
Andantino grazioso – Trio (ternary/minuet form, A major)
This movement of the trio receives the most criticism of all of the four movements. Brahms writes for the clarinet in a folk/waltz style that gives it an enthusiastic, cheery tune. The harmonies shift abruptly or in a linear motion at times to support the folk-like melody given by the clarinet and cello: one reason this movement is considered structurally unstable. Another reason this piece is considered weak is because the writing for the clarinet and cello are intertwined in a way such that they rely on one another: when the cello is playing may be in a spot where the clarinet has to breathe, or, contrarily, the clarinet may play when the cello must change their bowing or adjust their position. Many believe that Brahms experimenting with this trio format (in reference to this movement, particularly) shows that even a noted composer like Brahms struggles to write successfully for the timbre emitted from the combination of these three instruments.

Fourth movement 
Allegro (sonata form, A minor)
In this movement, Brahms varies his harmonic modulation drastically, yet manages to include his signature F–A–F (Frei aber froh) chord progression. This movement harnesses and controls the eccentricities of the Trio, and shows how Brahms still, even after retirement, is able to finagle his magnificent writing into a chamber ensemble that has little precedent. Brahms plays with rhythm in this movement more than the other movements, using syncopation between the clarinet and cello to transfer to the fourth theme of the movement. He uses canons between the three instruments and combines this with syncopation, especially at the end of the movement, which is definitely an audience pleaser.

References
Notes

Sources

External links 
 
 , Andreas Ottensamer (clarinet), Dejan Lazić (piano), Sol Gabetta (cello)

Piano trios by Johannes Brahms
Compositions for clarinet
Compositions for cello
1891 compositions
Compositions in A minor